The 1976 Lucas Industries British Open Squash Championship was unique in that it doubled as the men's edition of the 1976 World Open, which serves as the individual world championship for squash players. The event took place in London in England from 31 January to 7 February 1976. Geoff Hunt won his third British Open title, defeating Mohibullah Khan in the final.
Held at Wembley a record prize fund of £10,000 was put forward for this first professional World Open and 38th British Open.

.

Seeds

Draw and results

Section 1

Section 2

Section 3

Section 4

Semi-finals & Final

References

Men's British Open Squash Championships
Men's British Open
Men's British Open Squash Championship
Men's British Open Squash Championship
Squash competitions in London
Men's British Open Squash Championship
Men's British Open Squash Championship